Hymenopappus newberryi, or Newberry's hymenopappus, is a North American species of flowering plant in the daisy family. It grows in the states of New Mexico and Colorado in the southwestern United States.

Hymenopappus newberryi is a perennial herb up to 60 cm (2 feet) tall. One plant produces 3-8 flower heads per stem, each head 8 white or pink ray flowers surrounding 60–150 yellow disc flowers.

References

Newberryi
Flora of Colorado
Flora of New Mexico
Endemic flora of the United States
Plants described in 1874
Taxa named by Asa Gray
Taxa named by John Merle Coulter
Flora without expected TNC conservation status